British Vogue is a British fashion magazine published based in London since autumn 1916. It is the British edition of the American magazine Vogue and is owned and distributed by Condé Montrose Nast. British Vogue editor in 2012 claimed that, "Vogue power is universally acknowledged. It's the place everybody wants to be if they want to be in the world of fashion" and 85% of the magazine's readers agree that "Vogue is the Fashion Bible". The current editor is Enninful. The magazine is considered to be one that links fashion to high society and class, teaching its readers how to 'assume a distinctively chic and modern appearance'.

British Vogue is a magazine whose success is based upon its advertising rather than its sales revenue.  In 2007, it ran 2,020 pages of advertising at an average of £16,000 a page. It is deemed to be more commercial than other editions of Vogue. British Vogue is the most profitable British magazine as well as the most profitable edition of Vogue besides the US and China editions.

History 
During the First World War, Condé Nast, Vogues publisher, had to deal with restrictions on overseas shipping as well as paper shortages in America. The British edition of Vogue was the answer to this problem, providing Vogue fashion coverage in the British Isles when it was not practicable to receive it in the usual way. Under the London edition's second editor, Elspeth Champcommunal (1888–1976), the magazine was essentially the same as the American edition, except for its British English spellings. However, Champcommunal thought it important that Vogue be more than a fashion magazine.  It featured articles on 'society and sporting news... Health and beauty advice... travelogues... and editorials', making it a 'skillfully mixed cocktail'. Champcommunal held her editorial position until 1922.

Under its next editor, Dorothy Todd, a renowned Vogue editor due to her boldness, especially in her movement to blend the arts and fashion, the magazine shifted its focus from fashion to literature, featuring articles from Clive Bell about art exhibitions in Paris.  There were also notable features from noted English writers such as Virginia Woolf and Aldous Huxley. Due to Todd's changes, the magazine lost much of its audience, and she spent only four years as editor. British Vogue is not believed to have really taken off until after its third editor, Alison Settle, was appointed in 1926.

Under Audrey Withers (editor from 1940 to 1960), the magazine again took a literary direction, and during the Second World War it even took part in reporting the war. In 1944, the American photographer Lee Miller persuaded Withers to send her to Normandy to produce an article on wartime nursing; Miller then followed the Allied advance through Europe, reporting the liberation of Paris and sending a story from Buchenwald. Dame Anna Wintour edited the British edition from 1985 to 1987, before taking over Vogue in New York City.

Alexandra Shulman was Editor-in-Chief of the magazine from 1992 to 2017. When Shulman was editor, the magazine drew more than a million readers. Shulman was known for developing collector's issues of British Vogue, such as the 'Gold Millennium Issue' where celebrities and supermodels such as Kate Moss featured on the cover. Shulman was also praised for her use of up and coming photographers like Mario Testino.  Shulman became known for her attempt to change the face of fashion.  She pushed designers to stop using 'size-zero' models. In 2016, Shulman collaborated with photographer Josh Olins to shoot Catherine, Duchess of Cambridge on the cover of Vogue'''s centenary issue. The photographs were subsequently featured in the National Portrait Gallery, London The magazine under Shulman was the subject of Richard Macer's behind-the-scenes BBC documentary, Absolutely Fashion: Inside British Vogue (2016).

Edward Enninful was confirmed as the new editor-in-chief of British Vogue on 10 April 2017. Condé Nast International Chairman and CEO Jonathan Newhouse announced him as the successor to Alexandra Shulman, calling Enninful "an influential figure in the communities of fashion, Hollywood and music which shape the cultural zeitgeist", adding that "by virtue of his talent and experience, Edward is supremely prepared to assume the responsibility of British Vogue". Enninful's first issue as editor-in-chief was 2017's December issue, featuring British model and activist Adwoa Aboah on the cover. In September 2019, Enninful collaborated with Meghan, Duchess of Sussex on the September issue. The issue highlights "Forces for Change", and features on the cover 15 activists including actress Salma Hayek and interviews with former US First Lady Michelle Obama. The magazine's September 2020 triple gatefold cover featured pictures of 20 activists often associated with the Black Lives Matter movement, including Marcus Rashford and Adwoa Aboah. The Activism Now edition was photographed by Misan Harriman and was the first British Vogue'' cover taken by a black man in the magazine's 104-year history (Nadine Ijewere was the first black female to take a cover photograph). Actress Dame Judi Dench became the oldest person at age 85 to be featured on the June 2020 cover. In 2022, actor Timothée Chalamet became the first, solo male print cover star, in the magazine's history.

See also 
 List of British Vogue cover models
 List of Vogue cover models
 List of women's magazines
 List of men's magazines

References

External links 
 Official Site
 

Women's magazines published in the United Kingdom
Fashion magazines published in the United Kingdom
Condé Nast magazines
Magazines established in 1916
English-language magazines
1916 establishments in the United Kingdom
Monthly magazines published in the United Kingdom